Petya Gavazova (born 19 September 1968) is a Bulgarian former competitive figure skater. As a single skater, she represented Bulgaria at two European Championships, three World Championships, and the 1988 Winter Olympics in Calgary. She later partnered with Nikolay Tonev to compete in ice dancing. The duo appeared at two Worlds and one Europeans.

Competitive highlights

Single skating

Ice dancing with Tonev

References 

1968 births
Bulgarian female single skaters
Bulgarian female ice dancers
Living people
Olympic figure skaters of Bulgaria
Figure skaters at the 1988 Winter Olympics